Agile IT infrastructure, or Agile Infrastructure for short, is an emerging type of IT infrastructure that goes beyond Hyper-converged infrastructure and puts emphasis on:
 speed of implementing change;
 reducing complexity;
 resilience;
 quick adaptation to new technologies;
 taking advantage of lightweight deployment options;
 easy accessibility of management tools; and
 making everyone heroes, not just a few individuals.

References

Infrastructure
Computing_platforms
Information_technology